Las Bandurrias Airport ,  is an airstrip serving Riñinahue (es), a scattered community  east of Lago Ranco, a town in the Los Lagos Region of Chile.

West approach and departure are over Ranco Lake.

There is mountainous terrain north and south of the runway.

See also

Transport in Chile
List of airports in Chile

References

External links
OpenStreetMap - Las Bandurrias
OurAirports - Las Bandurrias
FallingRain - Las Bandurrias Airport

Airports in Los Lagos Region